Rear Admiral Sir Paul Woollven Greening  (4 June 1928 – 5 November 2008) was a Royal Navy officer and courtier, who served as Naval Secretary and Master of the Household.

Naval career
Educated at Mowden School and the Nautical College at Pangbourne, Greening joined the Royal Navy in 1946. He was given command of the minesweepers HMS Asheldham, HMS Messina, HMS Lewiston and then the frigate HMS Jaguar. He was appointed Fleet Plans Officer for the Far East Fleet in 1969 and, following his promotion to Captain, given command of the frigate HMS Aurora in 1970. He went on to be Captain, Naval Drafting in 1971, Director of Seaman Officer Appointments in 1974 and Captain of the Royal Naval College, Dartmouth in 1976. Promoted to rear admiral, he became Naval Secretary in 1978 and Flag Officer, Royal Yachts with specific responsibility for HM Yacht Britannia in 1981. He was responsible for planning the honeymoon of the Prince and Princess of Wales in August 1981. He retired in 1985.

He was appointed an Extra Equerry to the Queen in 1983 and Master of the Household of the Sovereign from 1986 to 1992.

Family
In 1951 he married Monica West (pre-deceased); they had a son and daughter.

References

|-

1928 births
2008 deaths
People educated at Pangbourne College
Royal Navy rear admirals
Military personnel from Sussex
Knights Grand Cross of the Royal Victorian Order
Masters of the Household